The Muslim Students Federation (abbreviated as the M. S. F.), in Kerala, is the student wing of Indian Union Muslim League in Kerala, India. M. S. F. in Kerala is currently headed by P. K. Navas (President), C. K Najaf (General Secretary), and Ashar Perumukk ( Treasurer). 

Muslim Students Federation is principally active in all state-run universities in Kerala and in affiliated colleges. It is the largest Muslim students organisation in Kerala. Indian Union Muslim League leaders C. H. Mohammed Koya, Minister of Education in various Kerala Governments and E. Ahamed, Union Minister of State, Ministry of External Affairs, were associated with the Muslim Students Federation.

History 
Local units of the Muslim Students Federation were active in Kerala in the 1930s. Malabar District M. S. F. was organised by Muslim League leader K. M. Seethi Sahib in 1942.

Kerala unit of the M. S .F. was formed at Alappuzha on 15 October 1958.

See also
Muslim Students Federation (disambiguation)
Muslim Youth League
Indian Union Muslim League

References

Student organisations in India
Indian Union Muslim League
Volunteer organisations in India
Student wings of conservative parties
Youth wings of conservative parties